Group A of the 1997 Fed Cup Europe/Africa Zone Group I was one of four pools in the Europe/Africa Zone Group I of the 1997 Fed Cup. Three teams competed in a round robin competition, with the top two teams advancing to the knockout stage.

Russia vs. Greece

Russia vs. Bulgaria

Greece vs. Bulgaria

See also
Fed Cup structure

References

External links
 Fed Cup website

1997 Fed Cup Europe/Africa Zone